Marcel Rubin (7 July 1905 – 12 May 1995) was an Austrian composer.

Born in Vienna, where he studied with Richard Robert and Franz Schmidt, he later emigrated to Paris, where he pursued further studies with Darius Milhaud. After living in Mexico City for a while, he returned to Vienna after the end of World War II.

Among the works he composed there are ten symphonies and the opera Kleider machen Leute (1969).

Honours and awards
 1959: State Prize for Music
 1961 and 1965: Award from the Theodor-Körner Foundation
 1964: Title of Professor
 1969: City of Vienna Prize for Music
 1970: Grand Austrian State Prize for Music
 1974: Austrian Cross of Honour for Science and Art, 1st class
 1979: Honorary Member of the Austrian Society for Contemporary Music
 1980: Austrian Decoration for Science and Art
 1985: Honorary Member of the Society of Friends of Music in Vienna
 1986: Gold Medal of Vienna

Selected compositions
Stage works
Die Stadt, ballet (1933, rev. 1980)
Kleider machen Leute, opera (1969)
Der Schneider im Himmel, fairy tale in music (1981)

Cantatas & oratorios
Die Albigenser (1961)
O ihr Menschen. Ein Heiligenstädter Psalm (1977)
Auferstehung (1986)
Licht über Damaskus (1988)

Orchestral works
Ten symphonies (between 1928 and 1986)
Concertos for double bass (1970), trumpet (1972), bassoon (1976), piano (1992), flute & strings (1994)
Sinfonietta for string orchestra (1966)

Chamber music
6 string quartets (between 1926 and 1991)
String Trio (1927, rev. 1962)
Sonata, for cello and piano (1928)
Sonata, for violin and piano (1974)
Concertino, for 12 cellos (1975)

Solo instrumental
4 piano sonatas (between 1925 and 1994)
Tageszeiten. 4 piano pieces (1955)
Petite Sérénade pour Guitare (1977)
Klaviermusik 94, for piano (1994)

References

External links

Further reading
Krones, Hartmut: Marcel Rubin: Eine Studie, in: Elisabeth Lafite (ed.): Österreichische Komponisten des XX. Jahrhunderts, vol. 22 (Vienna: Österreichischer Bundesverlag, 1975); ; .

1905 births
1995 deaths
20th-century classical composers
Austrian classical composers
Austrian opera composers
Male opera composers
Austrian male classical composers
Musicians from Vienna
Pupils of Darius Milhaud
Recipients of the Austrian Decoration for Science and Art
Recipients of the Austrian State Prize
Recipients of the Grand Austrian State Prize
20th-century French male musicians
Austrian emigrants to France